Gucheng County is a county of northwestern Hubei province, People's Republic of China, located in the eastern foothills of the Daba Mountains. It is under the administration of Xiangyang City, and is served by G70 Fuzhou–Yinchuan Expressway.

Administrative divisions
Nine towns:
Chengguan, Shihua, Shengkang (/), Miaotan, Wushan, Cihe, Nanhe, Zijin, Lengji

The only township is Zhaowan Township

Other areas:
Xieshan Forestry Area

Climate

References

External links

Counties of Hubei
Xiangyang